PARGY-LAD is an analogue of LSD. It is described by Alexander Shulgin in the book TiHKAL. PARGY-LAD is a hallucinogenic drug similar to LSD, but is considerably less potent than LSD with a dose of 160 micrograms producing only mild effects, and 500 micrograms required for full activity.

References

Psychedelic drugs
Lysergamides
Propargyl compounds